Genetically encoded voltage indicator (or GEVI) is a protein that can sense membrane potential in a cell and relate the change in voltage to a form of output, often fluorescent level. It is a promising optogenetic recording tool that enables exporting electrophysiological signals from cultured cells, live animals, and ultimately human brain. Examples of notable GEVIs include ArcLight, ASAP1, ASAP3, Archons, SomArchon, and Ace2N-mNeon.

History 
Despite that the idea of optical measurement of neuronal activity was proposed in the late 1960s, the first successful GEVI that was convenient enough to put into actual use was not developed until technologies of genetic engineering had become mature in the late 1990s. The first GEVI, coined FlaSh, was constructed by fusing a modified green fluorescent protein with a voltage-sensitive K+ channel (Shaker). Unlike fluorescent proteins, the discovery of new GEVIs were seldom inspired by the nature, for it is hard to find an organism which naturally has the ability to change its fluorescence based on voltage. Therefore, new GEVIs are mostly the products of genetic and protein engineering.

Two methods can be utilized to find novel GEVIs: rational design and directed evolution. The former method contributes to the most of new GEVI variants, but recent researches using directed evolution have shown promising results in GEVI optimization.

Structure 
GEVI can have many configuration designs in order to realize voltage sensing function. An essential feature of GEVI structure is that it must situate on the cell membrane. Conceptually, the structure of a GEVI should permit the function of sensing the voltage difference and reporting it by change in fluorescence. Usually, the voltage-sensing domain (VSD) of a GEVI spans across the membrane, and is connected to the fluorescent protein(s). However, it is not necessary that sensing and reporting should happen in different structures, e.g. Archons.

By structure, GEVIs can be classified into four categories based on the current findings: (1) GEVIs contain a fluorescent protein FRET pair, e.g. VSFP1, (2) Single opsin GEVIs, e.g. Arch, (3) Opsin-FP FRET pair GEVIs, e.g. MacQ-mCitrine, (4) single FP with special types of voltage sensing domains, e.g. ASAP1. A majority of GEVIs are based on the Ciona intestinalis voltage sensitive phosphatase (Ci-VSP or Ci-VSD (domain)), which was discovered in 2005 from the genomic survey of the organism. Some GEVIs might have similar components, but with different positioning of them. For example, ASAP1 and ArcLight both use a VSD and one FP, but the FP of ASAP1 is on the outside of the cell whereas that of ArcLight is on the inside, and the two FPs of VSFP-Butterfly are separated by the VSD, while the two FPs of Mermaid are relatively close to each other.

Characteristics 
A GEVI can be evaluated by its many characteristics. These traits can be classified into two categories: performance and compatibility. The performance properties include brightness, photostability, sensitivity, kinetics (speed), linearity of response, etc., while the compatibility properties cover toxicity (phototoxicity), plasma membrane localization, adaptability of deep-tissue imaging, etc. For now, no existing GEVI meets all the desired properties, so searching for a perfect GEVI is still a quite competitive research area.

Applications and advantages 
Different types of GEVIs are being developed in many biological or physiological research areas. It is thought to be superior to conventional voltage detecting methods like electrode-based electrophysiological recordings, calcium imaging, or voltage sensitive dyes. It has subcellular spatial resolution and temporal resolution as low as 0.2 milliseconds, about an order of magnitude faster than calcium imaging. This allows for spike detection fidelity comparable to electrode-based electrophysiology but without the invasiveness. Researchers have used it to probe neural communications of an intact brain (of Drosophila or mouse), electrical spiking of bacteria (E. coli), and human stem-cell derived cardiomyocyte.

Future directions 
For GEVI development, its future direction is highly coupled with the target applications. With newer generations of GEVIs overcome the poor performance of the first generation ones, we will see more routes open up for GEVIs to be used in more challenging and versatile applications. Like many other protein biosensors and actuators, once it passes the initial threshold of practicality, there will be more attempts to reshape the tool for its usage in different target applications, each with a different emphasis and requirement for a subset of performance metrics. For example, JEDI-2P, the latest generation of GEIV, is a fast, sensitive, bright, and photostable two-photon-compatible sensor which is considered to be almost perfect for many challenging deep-tissue imaging applications. However, authors of JEDI-2P stated that the negative-going (bright-to-dim) sensor is good for detecting subthreshold depolarizations and hyperpolarizations but positive-going (dim-to-bright) sensors might be better for spike detection. We may argue that it takes effort to engineer (screen) a perfect sensor, but often the more compelling reason is that simply there is not a unanimous definition of such perfection. For example, scientist might prefer sensors of different emission and excitation colors to be spectrally compatible with other optogenetic actuators. Recently, to compensate for the low signal-to-noise ratio (SNR) due to the poor brightness of GEVI, several denoising methods have been applied to increase SNR.

References 

Neuroscience
Biotechnology
Protein engineering
Electrophysiology